Off the Record is the fifth studio album by the English glam rock band Sweet. It was recorded at Audio International Studios in London between October 1976 and January 1977. The band produced with assistance from engineers Louis Austin and Nick Ryan.

Track listing
All songs written and composed by Brian Connolly, Steve Priest, Andy Scott and Mick Tucker.

European release
Side one
"Fever of Love" - 4:03
"Lost Angels" - 4:06
"Midnight to Daylight" - 3:34
"Windy City" - 7:30
Side two
"Live for Today" - 3:19
"She Gimme Lovin'" - 4:08
"Laura Lee" - 4:18
"Hard Times" - 4:01
"Funk It Up" - 3:34

Bonus tracks on 1990 reissue
"A Distinct Lack of Ancient" (B-side of 'Fever Of Love') - 4:07
"Stairway to the Stars" - 3:05
"Why Don't You Do It to Me" (B-side of 'Stairway To The Stars') - 3:11

Bonus tracks on 1999 reissue
"A Distinct Lack of Ancient" - 4:09
"Why Don't You Do It to Me" - 3:14

Bonus tracks on 2005 reissue
"A Distinct Lack of Ancient" - 4:07
"Funk It Up" (disco mix - US B-side of 'Funk It Up') - 5:27
"Stairway to the Stars" - 3:03
"Why Don't You Do It to Me" - 3:13
"Midnight to Daylight" (extended version) - 4:09
"Lost Angels" (demo version) - 3:46
"She Gimme Lovin'" (alternative version - previously unreleased) - 4:06
"Hard Times" (alternative version - previously unreleased) - 4:40

US release (LP only)
Side one
"Fever of Love" (different intro) - 3:59
"Lost Angels" - 4:02
"Midnight to Daylight" - 3:30
"Laura Lee" - 4:16
"Windy City" - 7:27

Side two
"Stairway to the Stars" (additional track) - 3:05
"Live for Today" (clean version) - 3:22
"Funk It Up (David's Song)" (same as RCA version) - 3:33
"Hard Times" - 4:00
"She Gimme Lovin'" - 4:04

Unlike the RCA issue, the Capitol cover featured the album title.

Singles
"Stairway to the Stars" was withheld from the RCA album release and later issued as a single as a follow-up to "Lost Angels" and "Fever of Love". All three singles proved to be commercial flops (except some countries like Sweden, Germany, Austria, South Africa, and Denmark, where all or some broke the top 10 and 20).

Songs covered
Raul Sepper recorded a cover of "Funk It Up" in Estonian, titled "Sein On Ees", in 1979. The German power metal act Gamma Ray covered "Lost Angels" on their 2013 Master of Confusion EP.

Personnel
Sweet
Brian Connolly – lead vocals
Steve Priest – bass guitar, harmonica, lead and backing vocals
Andy Scott – guitar, keyboards, synthesizers, backing vocals
Mick Tucker – drums, percussion, backing vocals

References

The Sweet albums
1977 albums
RCA Records albums